The 2017 Saint-Martin Senior League is the 46th season of the Saint-Martin Senior League. The season began on 20 January 2017. The competition is contested by seven teams and consists of a double round robin season followed by a 4 team play-off.

Clubs 

 Attackers
 Concordia
 Flamingo
 Junior Stars
 Marigot A
 Marigot B
 St. Louis Stars

Table

Play-off 
The semi-final first legs will be played 9 and 11 June 2017 at Stade Alberic Richards, and the second legs will be played 16 and 18 June 2017 at Stade Thelbert Carti. The final and third place match will be played 25 June 2017 at Stade Alberic Richards. The pairings for the play-off were #1 vs. #3 and #2 vs. #4, instead of the pairings used in previous seasons, #1 vs. #4 and #2 vs. #3.

References 

Football competitions in the Collectivity of Saint Martin
Saint-Martin